Dyschirius thoracicus is a species of ground beetle in the subfamily Scaritinae. It was described by P. Rossi in 1790.

References

thoracicus
Beetles described in 1790